Elahe Hesari (born August 9, 1983) is an Iranian actress. She has received various accolades, including nominations for two Hafez Awards. She won the Best Actress Award at the 9th Eurasia International Film Festival for Don't Worry Sarah (2013).

Career 
Elahe Hesari was born in 1983 in Qazvin. She is a graduate in English language and literature as well as in physical education. In high school, she was an active member of school theater groups and later attended acting classes at the "Culture and Art Institute of Everlasting Figures".
Keenly interested in acting, Hesari soon found her way into the world of professional acting through her acquaintance with the director Ebrahim Vahidzadeh. Her debut film was Tāksi-ye Nārenji (lit. The Orange Taxi (2008)), directed by Vahidzadeh. Hesari also appeared in Notfe-ye Shoom (lit. The Ominous Sperm), directed by Karim Atashi, the same year.

Among Hesari’s merits mention should be made of winning the Best Female Performance Award at the 9th Eurasia International Film Festival, Almaty, Kazakhstan, in 2013.

Besides acting, Hesari is a coach at a sports club. She is especially interested in yoga.
She has got two sisters, Elmira and Melika.

Filmography

Film 
 Tarāneh (Mehdi Sahebi), 2017
 Crocodile (Masood Takavar, 2017)
 Highlight (Asghar Naeemi, 2017)
 Bāzdam (Arash Sanjabi, 2016)
 Sophie and the beast (Mehdi Karampour, 2016)
 Māhgereftegi (Masood Atyābi, 2016)
 P-22 (Hosein Ghasemi Jami, 2014)
 Dāreh sobh misheh (Yalda Jebelli, 2014)
 Naghsh-e negār (Ali Atshani, 2013)
 Bending the Rules (Behnam Behzadi, 2012)
 Negarān nabāsh Sārā (Ali Reza Amini, 2012)
 Entehā-ye khiābān-e hashtom (Alireza Amini, 2011)
 Bitābi-e Bitā (Mehrdad Farid, 2011)
 The Freeway (Abbas Rafei, 2011)
 Zanān-e venoosi, mardān-e merrikhi (Kazem Rastgoftar, 2010)
 Zanhā shegeftangiz-and (Mehrdad Farid, 2010)
 Aroosak (Ebrahim Vahidzadeh, 2009)
 Notfe-ye shoom
 Tāksi-ye nārenji (Ebrahim Vahidzadeh, 2008)

Web

Television

Awards and nominations

References

External links
 
 Elahe Hesari's website on Official Website

 Aparat website – 1: الهه حصاری در دورهمی
 Aparat website – 2: الهه حصاری در برنامهٔ دورهمی (کامل)
 Tamasha website: الهه حصاری در برنامهٔ دورهمی
 Pars Naz website: الهه حصاری از راز جذابیت و زیبایی می‌گوید
 Dustan website: بیوگرافی و عکس‌های دیدنی الهه حصاری
 Coca website: بیوگرافی و عکس‌های اینستاگرام الهه حصاری و مادر و خواهر و همسرش
 Amazing website: عکس‌ها و بیوگرافی الهه حصاری، بازیگر سریال هشت و نیم دقیقه

Iranian actresses
1990 births
Living people
Iranian film actresses
People from Tehran